Harriet Rene "Khandi" Alexander (born September 4, 1957) is an American dancer, choreographer, and actress. She began her career as a dancer in the 1980s, and was a choreographer for Whitney Houston's world tours from 1988 to 1992.

During the 1990s, Alexander appeared in a number of films, including CB4 (1993), What's Love Got to Do with It (1993), Sugar Hill (1994), and There's Something About Mary (1998). She starred as Catherine Duke in the NBC sitcom NewsRadio from 1995 to 1998. She also had a major recurring role in the NBC medical drama ER (1995–2001) as Jackie Robbins, sister to Dr. Peter Benton. Alexander also received critical acclaim for her leading performance in the HBO miniseries The Corner in 2000.

From 2002 to 2009, Alexander starred as Dr. Alexx Woods in the CBS police procedural series CSI: Miami. From 2010 to 2013, she starred as LaDonna Batiste-Williams in the HBO drama Treme. Later in 2013, she joined the cast of the ABC drama Scandal as Maya Lewis, Olivia Pope's mother, for which she received a Primetime Emmy Award nomination in 2015. Alexander also received a Critics' Choice Television Award nomination for playing Bessie Smith's sister Viola in the 2015 HBO film Bessie.

Early life
Khandi Alexander was born in Jacksonville, Florida, the daughter of Alverina Yavonna (Masters), an opera and jazz singer, and Henry Roland Alexander, who owned a construction company. She was raised in Queens, New York, and was educated at Queensborough Community College. She appeared on Broadway, starring in Chicago, Bob Fosse's Dancin', and Dreamgirls. She was a choreographer for Whitney Houston's world tour from 1988 to 1992, and also appeared as a dancer in Natalie Cole's video for "Pink Cadillac" in 1988.

Career

Alexander began her acting career in the late 1980s. She made her television debut on the 1985 sketch-comedy show FTV. Since the early 1990s, Alexander has concentrated on film and TV, playing supporting roles in several movies, including CB4, Joshua Tree, What's Love Got to Do with It, Poetic Justice, and Sugar Hill.

In 1995, Alexander was cast as Catherine Duke on the NBC comedy series NewsRadio. She stayed with the show until season 4, episode 7, "Catherine Moves On", then returned for a final appearance in the season 5 premiere episode, "Bill Moves On" to memorialize Phil Hartman. She played the recurring character of Jackie Robbins in the medical drama series ER. Alexander has made a number of guest appearances on other television shows, including Law & Order: Special Victims Unit, NYPD Blue, Third Watch, Cosby, Better off Ted, La Femme Nikita, and Body of Proof.

In 2000, Alexander won critical acclaim for her performance as Fran Boyd, a mother addicted to drugs in the Emmy Award-winning HBO miniseries The Corner. She later appeared in the films Emmett's Mark and Dark Blue, and starred opposite Rob Lowe in the Lifetime television movie Perfect Strangers. In 2002 through 2008, she portrayed the character of Alexx Woods, a medical examiner in the CBS police drama CSI: Miami. Alexander left CSI: Miami shortly before the end of the 2007–2008 season. Her final appearance aired on May 5, 2008.  On February 2, 2009, she returned to the role of Alexx Woods for a guest appearance in the episode "Smoke Gets In Your CSI's". She returned again as Alexx Woods in guest appearances in the episodes "Out of Time" on September 21, 2009, and "Bad Seed" on October 19, 2009.

In fall 2008, Alexander was cast as a lead character in the HBO drama pilot Treme, that premiered on April 11, 2010. She played a bar owner in a neighborhood of New Orleans affected by Hurricane Katrina. She received critical acclaim for her performance in the show. Alexander starred in the award-winning HBO television series by David Simon from 2010 to 2013. The series ended after four seasons. She later was cast in Shonda Rhimes' drama series Scandal as Maya Lewis, Kerry Washington's character Olivia Pope's mother. In 2015, she was nominated for a Primetime Emmy Award for Outstanding Guest Actress in a Drama Series for her performance.

In 2014, Alexander was cast as older sister of Queen Latifah's title character in the HBO Film Bessie about iconic blues singer Bessie Smith. She was nominated for a Critics' Choice Television Award for Best Supporting Actress in a Movie/Miniseries.

Filmography

Film

Television

Music videos

Awards and nominations

References

External links 
 

1957 births
Living people
American television actresses
American film actresses
Actresses from Jacksonville, Florida
Actresses from New York City
American choreographers
American female dancers
Dancers from New York (state)
20th-century American actresses
21st-century American actresses
Queensborough Community College alumni
African-American actresses
African-American female dancers
African-American choreographers
20th-century African-American women
20th-century African-American people
21st-century African-American women
21st-century African-American people